Shawn Moltke  (born September 6, 1965) better known by his stage name MC Shan, is an American hip hop and R&B recording artist.

He is best known for his song "The Bridge" produced by Marley Marl, and for collaborating with Snow on "Informer", the international number-one hit single. MC Shan's New York birth records state he was born in Queens, New York.

Career
In 1985, Shan started on MCA Records with his first and only MCA single, "Feed the World". He was also interviewed in the 1986 cult documentary Big Fun In The Big Town. MCA were not sure about what to do with hip hop, thus he was dismissed from the label. Not long after, Shan signed to Cold Chillin' Records due to his relationship with Marl, and joined Marl's Juice Crew. His debut album Down by Law was released on Warner Bros in 1987. MC Shan was one of the first hip hop artists to have a major record deal with Warner Bros.

He also found himself to be a key player in the noted hip-hop rivalry, known as the Bridge Wars, between the Juice Crew and Boogie Down Productions. Controversy rose from his most famous single "The Bridge b/w Beat Biter". The A-side, one of the first song to sample "Impeach The President" (before was "Get Physical" for Steady B, also produced by Marley Marl) tells the story of how his crew got started in Queensboro Bridge. It also provided a template for other artists to use it as Queens representative anthem. The B-side is a mild-tempered diss-track aimed at LL Cool J for his song Rock The Bells which took the beat from "Marley Scratch", a promo by Marlon and Shawn from 1985 on NIA Records. Although at the time this practice was not allowed, KRS-One however responded with a parody of "The Bridge" named "South Bronx," and the Juice Crew sampled that song with a reply, "Kill That Noise." Slate magazine described the conflict: "In 1986, it was a beef that launched the star of KRS-One." A week later, Boogie Down Productions then released "The Bridge is Over," widely celebrated among hip-hop fans as the highest rated diss track. Somehow all the negative attention went to MC Shan. Years later, MC Shan remade "The Bridge" into "Da Bridge 2001", and strongly denied the bridge "was over", saying:

The Bridge was never over
We left our mark
This jam is dedicated to you and your boys
I brought my Queensbridge thugs to kill that noise

Shan's second album, Born To Be Wild, followed in 1988 and revealed Shan's b-boy persona, with production once again by Marley Marl. 1990's Play it Again, Shan displayed a more mature style but it also proved to be his last album. When Cold Chillin's sub-label Livin' Large was active, Shan was listed as one of its artists but only released two singles ("Hip Hop Roughneck" b/w "Watchin' My Style" and "Pee-Nile Reunion" (prod. Large Professor, feat. Kool G Rap, Neek The Exotic, Snow, and Diesel) b/w "Don't Call It A Comeback"). Despite the fact that he focused more on his production career (like Snow's 12 Inches of Snow, which featured "Informer", on which he appeared) he recorded "Da Bridge 2001" for Nas' 2000 compilation called QB's Finest, which also featured Mobb Deep, Cormega, and Nature.

Shan had a brief stint in films, playing a bit role in Steve Martin's L.A. Story as Rappin' Waiter. Shan is credited as the guest rapper on the Sum 41 song "Dave's Possessed Hair/It's What We're All About" in the album Half Hour of Power.

In June 2017, MC Shan released his first new studio album in 27 years titled Bars Over Bullshit, which was released digitally through iTunes and Google Play.

Discography

Studio albums

Unreleased albums
You Love to Hear the Story (2007, Bungalo)

Compilation albums

EPs

Singles

As lead artist

Singles
1985: "Marley Scratch"
1985: "Feed The World"
1986: "The Bridge"/"Beat Biter"
1986: "Jane, Stop This Crazy Thing"
1987: "Left Me Lonely"/"Kill That Noise"
1988: "A Mind Is A Terrible Thing To Waste'
1988: "I Pioneered This"
1988: "Juice Crew Law" / "They Used To Do It In The Park"
1990: "I Ran The Game"
1990: "It Don't Mean A Thing"
1991: "Time For Us To Defend Ourselves"
1991: "Ain't It Good To You"
1993: "Hip Hop Roughneck"
1993: "Pee-Nile Reunion" / "Don't Call It A Comeback"
2001: "Da Bridge 2001" (w QB's Finest)
2012: "Let's Bring Hip Hop Back"
2013: "Everybody Wanna Be A Big Star Drive A Big Car"

References

Notes

Citations

External list
[ MC Shan] at Allmusic

1965 births
African-American male rappers
People from Long Island City, Queens
Living people
Rappers from New York City
Cold Chillin' Records artists
21st-century American rappers
21st-century American male musicians
21st-century African-American musicians
20th-century African-American people
Juice Crew members